Lineras Torres Jr. (born October 15, 2000) is an American professional  baseball pitcher in the Cleveland Guardians organization.

Amateur career
Torres graduated from Beacon High School in Beacon, New York, where he played baseball. Between his junior and senior years, USA Baseball chose him for their 18-and-under team. As a senior at Beacon, he pitched to a 0.68 earned run average while striking out 85 batters in 41 innings pitched. He committed to play college baseball at St. John's University.

Professional career
The Cleveland Indians selected Torres with the 41st selection of the 2018 Major League Baseball draft. Torres signed with the Indians on June 19 for $1.35 million. He made his professional debut with the Arizona League Indians and spent the whole season there, compiling a 1.76 ERA in six games (five starts). He underwent Tommy John surgery prior to the 2019 season, forcing him to miss the year. 

Torres did not play a minor league game in 2020 due to the cancellation of the season. He spent the 2021 season with the Lynchburg Hillcats, appearing in twenty games (19 starts) and going 2-7 with a 6.29 ERA and 73 strikeouts over  innings.

References

External links

Living people
2000 births
People from Beacon, New York
Baseball players from New York (state)
Baseball pitchers
Arizona League Indians players
Lynchburg Hillcats players
Lake County Captains players